The Carmans River is a  long river in Brookhaven, New York in Suffolk County on Long Island.

It is one of the four largest rivers on Long Island and is similar to other Long Island rivers in that is totally groundwater generated (e.g., no lakes), although a lake did exist long ago. Almost all of the river is specifically protected by the Central Long Island Pine Barrens. All of it is designated by New York State as either a "Scenic River" or a "Recreational River."

The river, which was earlier once called the Connecticut River (in connection with early settlers from Connecticut, and also due to the mistaken belief that it is fed underground by that river) is named for Samuel Carman who married into milling families on the river in the 19th century, used it to run a mill, and operated a hunting club for residents from New York City.

It is fresh water for the first  and then becomes an estuary for the last two, as it encounters the tidal effects of Great South Bay.

There are four dams on the upper river at Upper Mill Pond, Lower Mill Pond, Southaven County Park, and the Sunrise Highway.

Adjoining the river is the Wertheim National Wildlife Refuge.

The river formed the western boundary of the massive Manor St. George under William "Tangier" Smith who in the 17th century owned most of modern-day Brookhaven south of the Sunrise Highway. A manor subsequently built by the Smith family is located in Shirley at the mouth.

In 1967 Art Cooley, a teacher at Bellport High School, noting a decline in the osprey population on the river was one of the founders of the Environmental Defense Fund which was to lead the fight to ban DDT.

Southaven County Park encompasses upstream parts of the river and special regulations trout fishing can be accessed through them. In recent years, wild turkeys have been re-introduced into this park, and have re-populated many of the surrounding areas.

List of crossings of the Carmans River

References

External links
NYSwaterfronts.com profile of river
brookhavensouthhaven.org profile of river
Carmnet profile of river

Rivers of Suffolk County, New York
Brookhaven, New York
Rivers of New York (state)